Pseudococculina rimula is a species of sea snail, a marine gastropod mollusk in the family Pseudococculinidae.

Distribution
This species occurs in the Atlantic Ocean off Southeast Brazil.

Description 
The maximum recorded length of the white, patelliform shell is 3.3 mm.

Habitat 
Minimum recorded depth is 350 m. Maximum recorded depth is 400 m.

References

Pseudococculinidae
Gastropods described in 2003